F. Javier Cevallos is an Ecuadorian academic administrator who is the current president of Framingham State University in Framingham, MA. He began his tenure July 1, 2014 and will retire August 30, 2022. He previously worked in the same role at Kutztown University from 2002 until being hired at Framingham.

Cevallos was born in Cuenca, Ecuador. He earned his bachelor's degree at the University of Puerto Rico at Mayagüez, and his master's and doctoral degrees from the University of Illinois at Urbana-Champaign. He taught Spanish at University of Maine, then transferred to the University of Massachusetts Amherst where he became a full professor.

Cevallos has two children.

See also
University of Puerto Rico at Mayaguez people

References

Presidents of the University of Massachusetts system
Year of birth missing (living people)
Living people
Ecuadorian emigrants to the United States
University of Illinois Urbana-Champaign alumni
Kutztown University of Pennsylvania
University of Massachusetts Amherst faculty